Entrikin Glacier is a broad sweeping glacier flowing eastward from the Churchill Mountains of Antarctica into Matterson Inlet. It was named by the Advisory Committee on Antarctic Names for Lieutenant Commander Joseph W. Entrikin, a U.S. Navy pilot with Squadron VX-6 during Operation Deep Freeze I, 1955–56.

See also
 List of glaciers in the Antarctic
 Glaciology

References 

Glaciers of Oates Land